Parasport may refer to:
Parasports, sports for disabled people
Parasport.de, a German aircraft manufacturer